Agdistis melitensis is a moth of the Pterophoroidea family. It is found in Malta, Sicily and Sardinia.

External links
Fauna Europaea

Agdistinae
Moths of Europe
Moths described in 1954